Marinduque Academy (Barangay Gitnang Bayan) is a private high school located in the municipality Mogpog, Marinduque, Philippines. It was founded in October 1946. Its main building is located outside its campus and consists of administration offices, a library, a computer room, band instruments storage, a laboratory, and a few classrooms. The school campus, The Annex, is located a few streets away from the main building, and is surrounded by open fields. It consists of the campus quadrangle, a stage, various classrooms, canteens, and different areas for sports and recreation.

Education
The Marinduque provides secondary education, from grade 7 to 10, to elementary graduates and is one of the leading high schools of the province.

It consists of six levels, or largely based on the US school system. Grade 7 has five core subjects: mathematics, science, English, Filipino, and Asian history. Grade 8 has mathematics, science, English, Filipino, and world history. Grade 9 has mathematics, science, Filipino, English, and economics. The final year has calculus, advanced algebra, physics, Filipino, literature, and economics. Minor subjects include Health, music, arts, technology, home economics, and physical education.

Administration
Helen L. Valdez (President)

See also
 Education in the Philippines

References

Schools in Marinduque